State Highway 211 (SH 211) (Hill Country Parkway) is a  state highway west of the city of San Antonio in the U.S. state of Texas.  This route was designated in 1986 as an access route to the Texas Research Park.  Portions of the route were built, but significant landowner opposition kept the connecting section from being completed.  The completed sections of the route consist of a southern section from U.S. Highway 90 (US 90) north to Farm to Market Road 1957 (FM 1957) and a northern section from FM 471 north to SH 16. The Texas Transportation Commission has approved a pass-through toll agreement that Bexar County submitted in October 2008. This proposal will allow for development of a segment of SH 211 (Hill Country Parkway) from 1.33 miles south of FM 1957 to FM 471 and improvements to FM 1957 (Potranco Road) from Loop 1604 to the Medina County line. The completion of the section between FM 1957 (Potranco Road) to FM 471 (Culebra Road) will finally allow for seamless travel from Hwy 90 at the south end, north to SH 16 (Bandera Road). The improvements to FM 1957 (Potranco Road) will allow for the necessary widening of the two-lane roadway which is dealing with new suburban growth and traffic for which it wasn't built to handle.

History

The current alignment was designated on March 31, 1986, from US 90 northward to SH 16.  On November 29, 1988, the designation was extended northeastward from SH 16 to FM 3351. Construction of the current segments of the highway were completed in the early 1990s.  The southern portion was the first to be completed with the interchange at US 90 and the bridge over Lucas Creek completed in 1990. The northern portion was completed the following year in 1991 with the completion of the bridges over San Geronimo Creek.

SH 211 was previously designated on August 1, 1934 on a route from Brenham northward to Independence. On January 26, 1935, it extended north to Clay. On July 15, 1935, this extension was cancelled. On January 6, 1939, the remainder of SH 211 was cancelled. On January 22, 1940, SH 211 was restored (south of Old Independence only). On October 26, 1942, SH 211 was cancelled and mileage was transferred to Farm to Market Road 50 and State Highway Spur 197 (Spur 197 became Farm to Market Road 390 and Farm to Market Road 390 Spur on March 13, 1958).

Route description 
SH 211 currently exists in two separate sections west of San Antonio.  The southern section begins at a diamond interchange with US 90 in western Bexar County.  The route travels to the north as a two-lane highway with a northbound passing lane for the majority of the route and is known as either the Texas Research Parkway or the Hill Country Parkway (once it's finally completed), providing access to the Texas Research Park and a Citi service center. This  section of the highway ends at FM 1957 just east of the Bexar/Medina county line.

The northern section (Hill Country Parkway) begins at FM 471 in Medina County and heads north as a two-lane highway, crossing back over into Bexar County and passes briefly through the San Antonio city limits before ending at SH 16.  The northern section of the highway features the occasional passing lane in both directions. This  section of the roadway includes a design to provide protection to the Edwards Aquifer, the drinking water supply of San Antonio.  To prevent runoff from the highway entering the aquifer, a  bridge was sealed to prevent it from leaking and an aqueduct was constructed nearby to carry the runoff.

There are plans to connect the two segments, but there were insufficient funds available to complete the nearly  project and right-of-way needs to be acquired.  TxDOT only has $7.7 million of the $30 million required for construction costs. Bexar County will pay for the balance of the project costs with TxDOT reimbursing the County when funds become available. Relocation assistance is being provided to landowners to persuade them to sell their property for the highway.  With a shortage of funds and the right-of-way not purchased, there is no time table for construction.  Local opposition to the extension cite greater highway needs elsewhere, environmental concerns in the corridor, and a reluctance to sell land needed for the highway as chief concerns of the highway.  Once completed, the highway is believed to provide relief to nearby Loop 1604.

As of mid July 2017 the findings for the environmental impact study have been released. After multiple delays, the connector broke ground in late 2020.  A Summer or Fall 2022 completion is anticipated.

The traffic volume of the highway is dramatically different between the southern and northern sections.  The southern section sees traffic volumes six times of that of the northern section.  The traffic volume of the southern section saw a slight increase from 2005 to 2006.  In 2005, it had a traffic volume of 6,450 annual average daily traffic (AADT), which increased to 6,700 AADT in 2006.  The traffic volume of the northern section saw a slight increase from 2005 to 2006 as well.  In 2005, it had a traffic volume of 1,000 AADT near the southern end of the road and 1,300 AADT near the northern end.  In 2006, these numbers had increased to 1,050 and 1,550 AADT respectively.

Major intersections

See also

References

211
Transportation in Bexar County, Texas
Transportation in Medina County, Texas